"Eye in the Sky" is a song by British rock band the Alan Parsons Project, released as a single from their sixth studio album, Eye in the Sky (1982), in August 1982. It hit No. 3 on the Billboard charts in the U.S. in October 1982, No. 1 in both Canada and Spain, and No. 6 in New Zealand, it was their most successful release. The instrumental piece entitled "Sirius" segues into "Eye in the Sky" on the original recording.

In 2019, Alan Parsons recorded a version in Catalan, under the title "Seré els teus ulls al camí" ("I'll be your eyes on the road"), for the CD edited by La Marató de TV3, a telethon devoted to raising funds for the research of incurable diseases.

Overview
On the original recording, the 1:54 minute instrumental piece entitled "Sirius" immediately precedes, and segues into, "Eye in the Sky". On the single release, "Eye in the Sky" appears on its own, with "Sirius" edited out; that was the version usually played on pop radio at the time. However, album-oriented rock and classic rock stations now almost always include the "Sirius" intro.

Personnel
 Alan Parsons – Fairlight CMI, production, engineering, composer
 Eric Woolfson – Wurlitzer electric piano, vocals, composer, lyrics
 Ian Bairnson – acoustic and electric guitars
 David Paton – bass
 Stuart Elliott – drums
 Chris Rainbow – backing vocals

Charts

Weekly charts

Year-end charts

Certifications

Cover versions 
 Israeli artist Noa covered this song on her 2002 album, Now.
 Folk rock artist Jonatha Brooke covered this song on her 2004 album, Back in the Circus.
 The Portland, Oregon band Viva Voce recorded the song in 2007 as part of a compilation album called Bridging the Distance, made to benefit p:ear, a local program designed to assist homeless and transitional youth.
 Gary War covered the song on his 2008 album New Raytheonport.
 Rapper Immortal Technique sampled the song on his 2011 album, The Martyr.
 Synthpop artist Parralox released a cover of this song as a single in 2013.
 An instrumental cover of the song was released on jazz guitarist Gilad Hekselman's 2013 album This Just In.
 Asia featuring John Payne released a cover of this song on their album Recollections: A Tribute to British Prog in 2014.
 American band Awolnation released a cover of this song on their album My Echo, My Shadow, My Covers & Me in 2022.  It featured American musician Beck.
 Australian electronic music group The Avalanches sampled "Eye in the Sky" in their 2020 single "Interstellar Love" featuring American soul singer Leon Bridges.

Critics in Europe and North America have pointed to similarities between the melody of the choruses of Lady A's 2010 single "Need You Now" and "Eye in the Sky".

References

External links
 Lyrics of this song
 Songfacts - Eye in the Sky by The Alan Parsons Project
 

1982 songs
1982 singles
The Alan Parsons Project songs
RPM Top Singles number-one singles
Number-one singles in Spain
Songs written by Eric Woolfson
Arista Records singles
Songs written by Alan Parsons
Song recordings produced by Alan Parsons
Rock ballads
1980s ballads